Alexey Lavrinenko (born August 20, 1955, Kazan) is a Russian political figure and a deputy of the 7th and 8th State Dumas.

From 1977 to 1989, he worked as a veterinarian in the Stavropol Krai. In 1996-2016, Lavrinenko was the chairman of the agricultural cooperative named after Iosif Apanasenko. In 2012, he was a confidant of the presidential candidate Vladimir Putin. In 2013, he was appointed co-chairman of the regional headquarters of the All-Russia People's Front in the Stavropol Krai. On September 18, 2016, he was elected deputy of the 7th State Duma. In 2021, Lavrinenko got re-elected for the 8th State Duma.

On 24 March 2022, the United States Treasury sanctioned him in response to the 2022 Russian invasion of Ukraine.

References

1955 births
Living people
United Russia politicians
21st-century Russian politicians
Eighth convocation members of the State Duma (Russian Federation)
Seventh convocation members of the State Duma (Russian Federation)
People from Petrovsky District, Stavropol Krai
Russian individuals subject to the U.S. Department of the Treasury sanctions